The Museum of Contemporary Design and Applied Arts (French: Musée de design et d'arts appliqués contemporains, MUDAC) is a museum in Lausanne, Switzerland.

See also 
 List of cultural property of national significance in Switzerland: Vaud
 Applied arts
 List of art museums

Notes and references

External links 

 
 Page on the website of the City of Lausanne

Museums in Lausanne
Art museums and galleries in Switzerland